Homeobox protein notochord (NOTO) is a transcription factor encoded by the gene notochord homeobox (NOTO) located on the short arm of chromosome 2 (2p13.2) in humans (Homo sapiens). An ortholog of NOTO is found in the house mouse (Mus musculus), among other species, as the gene notochord homeobox (Noto) located on chromosome 6, which encodes the homologous transcription factor homeobox protein notochord (Noto).

In the house mouse, Noto is expressed in cells comprising the primitive node (node) of the developing embryo and functions to define the shape of the primitive node, help develop the lateral (left-right) asymmetry of the embryo, and form cilia primarily on posterior nodal cells. Noto is also essential for the proper development of the caudal notochord. Noto acts downstream of the genes Foxa2 and T, and its expression is absent in embryos with mutant forms of Foxa2 and T. However, a direct relationship for the regulation of Noto expression by Foxa2 and T has not yet been confirmed. In contrast, Noto acts upstream of Foxj1 and Rfx3, which both function in the ciliogenesis of certain other mouse tissues.

Mouse embryos with mutant forms of Noto have been characterized by shortened nodal cilia, basal bodies deeply embedded in the cell cytoplasm, and/or an abnormally-developed caudal notochord (complete absence in some cases). In one experiment, replacing Noto with Foxj1 resulted in functional nodal cilia, but only with Noto expression were cilia localized on posterior nodal cells and the normal shape of the node established. Additionally, Noto mutant embryos are subject to randomization of lateral asymmetry and are therefore often characterized by isomerization of the lungs, malformation of the cardiac outflow tract, heterotaxia, and/or situs inversus.

References 

Genes on human chromosome 2